Vehicle title branding is the use of a permanent designation on a vehicle's title, registration or permit documents to indicate that a vehicle has been written off due to collision, fire or flood damage or has been sold for scrap.

The designation or brand is mandatory in most provinces and states in North America when an insurer or vehicle owner writes off a vehicle as a "total loss". Typically this means the cost to repair the vehicle would equal or exceed the car's value, although legal definitions vary.

Objectives 
The title branding programs typically have two objectives:
A deterrent to auto theft: If a vehicle is a complete loss due to an accident, its serial number (VIN, Vehicle identification number) and registration documents could still be of potential value to persons dealing in stolen cars. The diminished sale value of a title branded vehicle reduces the profitability of switching the registration and VIN from an accident vehicle to that of a stolen vehicle of the same make and model/year, in an attempt to register it as a rebuilt car and sell it.
A consumer-protection warning: Cars which have been involved in serious collisions often find their way into auctions and onto dealers' lots. A permanent record of a severe accident warns potential subsequent owners that a car has been damaged (and possibly repaired). Properly repaired and carefully inspected, a vehicle may be acceptable – but an improper repair after a serious accident may leave the vehicle frame, body or key electrical and mechanical systems in damaged or non-roadworthy condition.

Mandatory vehicle branding 

In North America, the vast majority of vehicle titles are issued by individual provinces/states and territories. Most have implemented some branding scheme to warn subsequent owners of a vehicle of severe damage to a vehicle due to collision, theft or disaster. The brands and the criteria used to assign them vary widely from one jurisdiction to another.

With the exception of 'salvage' (which may be replaced by the 'rebuilt' brand after repair and structural inspection, depending on the rules and regulations of the issuing district), the brands are permanent. Once a vehicle identification number has been associated with one of these brands, it will not be removed by authorities in that jurisdiction or in other jurisdictions with similar vehicle branding laws.

There is no consistent list of brands or of conditions under which they apply. What most US states call "junk" and most Canadian provinces call "irreparable" («irrécupérable») can be labelled "salvage" in some other jurisdiction – either because the criteria are different or because the same brand has been confusingly been given a different name. In Alberta only, "non repairable" is used to mean irreparable – in most other jurisdictions including Alberta, "salvage" means that the vehicle can indeed be repaired but that the cost of doing so is most likely prohibitive.

Issues and limitations 
In North America, vehicle licenses are normally issued by individual provinces and states. Each operates under different regulations.

In some cases, the criteria to define a "total loss" vary – some base the cutoff amount on the nominal value of the vehicle in working condition, others look instead at the value of a working vehicle minus the value of a collision vehicle as scrap, salvage or parts. The percentage of the original value at which the "total loss" label is applied also varies.

These differences are sometimes exploited by schemes such as "title washing", in which a vehicle branded as 'junk' in one jurisdiction is registered in another, moving from state to state until one state with slightly different regulations brands the same vehicle as 'salvage' but repairable. A vehicle with Arizona registration and a 'salvage' title for salt water damage would, for instance, represent a red flag as a vehicle possibly once affected by environmental conditions and events elsewhere such as Hurricane Katrina. Vehicles with salt water or hurricane flood damage often have severe corrosion and electrical problems which cannot be properly repaired, so are best avoided.

The system also depends on the insurer or the owner of the damaged vehicle to provide information needed to determine the cost of damage to apply the brand to title, despite the fact that doing so will further reduce the vehicle's remaining resale value. Costs estimates are widely variable; if one estimate is based on factory-new parts, another on new aftermarket parts and yet another based on junkyard parts, the numbers will vary widely – with further variance added based on who does the repairs. Damage to automotive unibody frames (commonly used in most cars since 1967 to save weight) requires special expertise and equipment to measure, with factory tolerances typically as tight as 3 mm (1/8").

While some vehicles (such as cars exported overseas after severe collision or damaged before the introduction of mandatory branding) may carry no warnings as to their history, others may be branded as "total loss" when they could have been quite repairable in the hands of someone willing to install used parts and do the work at a more modest price.

If a vehicle is branded as 'junk' or 'irreparable' in error, or importation paperwork indicates it as imported 'for parts', there may be no straightforward means provided in legislation to remedy these errors. These vehicles, if not exported to another jurisdiction with different regulations, will never be registerable or licensed again – even if all needed repairs are made and verified.

Such permanent records of damage do not always exist in cases where damaged vehicles retain a clear title. For example, ConsumerReports.org reported that vehicle history checks would at times produce "clean" results despite the vehicles being offered for sale as damaged on such websites as eBay.com and even eRepairables.com, a site specializing in the advertisement of salvage cars for sale.

See also 
 Lemon (automobile)
 Used car
 Vehicle history report
 Vehicle identification number

References

External links
 Arkansas – Damaged vehicle title regulations
 Minnesota title-branding legislation
 Kentucky legislation
 NY Department of Motor Vehicles
 Ministry of Transport, Ontario
 Societé d'assurance automobile, Québec
 Wisconsin Department of Transport consumer protection info
 US Federal Trade Commission Vehicle buyback disclosure project
 National Insurance Crime Bureau (US VINcheck)
 Used cars hiding flood damage, CBS 5 San Francisco

Vehicle law
Used car market